Leon Hayes (born 4 March 2004) is an English professional rugby league footballer who plays as a  for the Warrington Wolves in the Betfred Super League.

He has spent time on loan from Warrington at the West Wales Raiders in Betfred League 1.

In 2022 Hayes made his début for the Wire in the Super League against the Huddersfield Giants.

References

External links
Warrington Wolves profile
RISING STAR PROFILE - Profile on Warrington Wolves youngster Leon Hayes

2004 births
Living people
English rugby league players
Rugby league halfbacks
Rugby league players from Warrington
South Wales Scorpions players
Warrington Wolves players